General elections were held in Japan on 1 March 1894. The Jiyūtō remained the largest party, winning 120 of the 300 seats.

Results

Post-election composition by prefecture

References

1894 03
1894 elections in Japan
Japan
March 1894 events
1894